Malard County is in Tehran province, Iran. The capital of the county is the city of Malard. At the 2006 census, the region's population (as Malard District of Shahriar County) was 291,608 in 77,093 households. The following census in 2011 counted 373,994 people in 108,221 households, by which time the district had been separated from the county to form Malard County. At the 2016 census, the county's population was 377,292 in 115,154 households.

Administrative divisions

The population history and structural changes of Malard County's administrative divisions over three consecutive censuses are shown in the following table. The latest census shows two districts, four rural districts, and two cities.

References

 

Counties of Tehran Province